The 2000 Colorado State Rams football team represented Colorado State University in the 2000 NCAA Division I-A football season. The team was led by eighth-year head coach Sonny Lubick and played its home games at Hughes Stadium. They finished the regular season with a 9–2 record overall and a 6–1 record in Mountain West Conference games, making them conference champions. The team was selected to play in the Liberty Bowl, in which they defeated Louisville.

Schedule

Rankings

References

Colorado State
Colorado State Rams football seasons
Mountain West Conference football champion seasons
Liberty Bowl champion seasons
Colorado State Rams football